The 2003 Fresno State football team represented California State University, Fresno in the 2003 NCAA Division I-A football season, and competed as a member of the Western Athletic Conference.  Led by head coach Pat Hill, the Bulldogs played their home games at Bulldog Stadium in Fresno, California.

Personnel

Coaching Staff

Roster

Schedule

Game summaries

at No. 12 Tennessee

Oregon State

at No. 1 Oklahoma

Louisiana Tech

Portland State

at Colorado State

at Hawaii

Rice

at SMU

at Nevada

San Jose State

No. 20 Boise State

at UTEP

vs. UCLA (Silicon Valley Classic)

References

External links
 2003 Fresno State roster

Fresno State
Fresno State Bulldogs football seasons
Silicon Valley Football Classic champion seasons
Fresno State Bulldogs football